The  was an army of the Imperial Japanese Army during the final stages of World War II.

History 
The Japanese 43rd Army was formed on  March 10, 1945 under the Northern China Area Army as part of the last desperate defense effort by the Empire of Japan to deter possible landings of Allied forces in Shandong province during Operation Downfall.  The Japanese 43rd Army consisted mostly of poorly trained and poorly equipped reservists from other units.

It was demobilized at the surrender of Japan on August 15, 1945 at Jinan without having seen combat.

List of Commanders

References

Books

External links
 

Military units and formations disestablished in 1945
43
Military units and formations established in 1945